The Sweden national football B team was a secondary football team controlled by the Swedish Football Association. Sweden B played their first game against Norway on 29 September 1929, a game which ended in a 3–1 victory. Their last game was a 1–0 win against Poland on 21 May 1997. After that game the Swedish B team became defunct.

See also
 Sweden national football team
 Sweden Olympic football team
 Sweden national under-21 football team
 Sweden national under-20 football team
 Sweden national under-19 football team
 Sweden national under-17 football team

References

European national B association football teams
B
1929 establishments in Sweden